Alexis Ryan (born August 18, 1994) is an American racing cyclist, who rides for American amateur team . She is the sister of fellow racing cyclist Kendall Ryan.

In November 2015 she was announced as part of the  team's inaugural squad for the 2016 season.

Major results

2007
 1st  Cross-country, National Junior Mountain Bike Championships
2008
 1st  Junior race, National Cyclo-cross Championships
2010
 1st  Junior race, National Cyclo-cross Championships
 2nd Road race, National Junior Road Championships
2011
 National Junior Road Championships
1st  Road Race
1st  Criterium
2012
 National Junior Road Championships
1st  Road Race
1st  Criterium
 1st  Team pursuit, National Junior Track Championships
 5th Glencoe Grand Prix
 8th Lake Bluff Twilight Criterium
2013
 National Under-23 Road Championships
1st  Criterium
2nd Road race
 Winston-Salem Cycling Classic
3rd Road race
3rd Criterium
2015
 1st Fort McClellan Road Race
 3rd Littleton Criterium
 6th Criterium, National Road Championships
 8th Overall The Women's Tour
2016
 4th Open de Suède Vårgårda TTT
 9th Road race, National Road Championships
2017
 Holland Ladies Tour
1st  Mountains classification
1st  Combativity classification, Stage 5
 3rd Open de Suède Vårgårda TTT
 5th Overall Women's Tour Down Under
1st  Young rider classification
 10th Overall Ladies Tour of Norway
2018
 1st Acht van Westerveld
 1st Stage 1 Tour Cycliste Féminin International de l'Ardèche
 2nd Omloop Het Nieuwsblad
 2nd Ronde van Drenthe
 3rd Overall Festival Elsy Jacobs
 5th Amstel Gold Race
2019
 1st Stage 1 (TTT) Giro Rosa
 4th Acht van Westerveld
 5th Road race, National Road Championships
 5th Omloop Het Nieuwsblad
2021
 3rd Dwars door Vlaanderen

References

External links

Living people
American female cyclists
1994 births
21st-century American women